Al-Shamasiyah Governorate is one of the governorates of the Al-Qassim region in the Kingdom of Saudi Arabia, and it is the eastern front of Al-Qassim. The governorate is famous for its cultivation, especially palm trees, and is considered a tourist destination for residents and visitors to the area in the spring.

Administrative division 
The governorate is classified as Category B, and a number of villages and centers are affiliated to it. The governor is Fahd bin Radi Al-Radi. Shammasiya has a population of approximately 15,000.

Shammasiyah Municipality 
A village complex for the Shamasiyah governorate was approved in the budget of the fiscal year 1397/1398 AH and began its work on Muharram 1, 1398 AH. With its services, it included the governorate of Oyoun Al-Jawa in the north, the center of Uqlat Al-Suqur in the west, and the center of Drayeh in the south.

Affiliated states 
 Al Rubiyah
 Al Nabqiyah
 Umm Hazm
 Umm Taliha
 Al Sarout
 Al Barjisyat
 Al Rualiyah
 Umm Sidrah
 Al Rikiah
 Al Aweqila
 Al Ruwaidat
 Al Duwaihra
 Al Rikibinia
 Al Mustawi

Economy 
Shamsiya governorate depends on agriculture, especially palm and wheat. It is considered an oasis filled with palm trees, and its people depend on growing wheat in the rain.

References 

https://web.archive.org/web/20191211150421/http://www.al-jazirah.com/2017/20170619/ln52.htm
https://www.spa.gov.sa/2376556
https://web.archive.org/web/20200918232318/https://www.stats.gov.sa/sites/default/files/lqsym_4.pdf
https://web.archive.org/web/20191117223908/https://www.stats.gov.sa/sites/default/files/al-qaseem_region_ar.pdf
https://web.archive.org/web/20191117223908/https://www.stats.gov.sa/sites/default/files/al-qaseem_region_ar.pdf
https://web.archive.org/web/20190428095131/https://www.qassim.gov.sa/AR/SubMunicipalities/ALShmasia/Pages/default.aspx

Populated places in Al-Qassim Province